Kniahynychi (Knyahynychi;) is a village in Ivano-Frankivsk Raion, Ivano-Frankivsk Oblast near Rohatyn. It belongs to Rohatyn urban hromada, one of the hromadas of Ukraine. Its population in 2001 was 718 people.

History 
The village had an important Jewish population before World War II.

Until 18 July 2020, Kniahynychi belonged to Rohatyn Raion. The raion was abolished in July 2020 as part of the administrative reform of Ukraine, which reduced the number of raions of Ivano-Frankivsk Oblast to six. The area of Rohatyn Raion was merged into Ivano-Frankivsk Raion.

References

External links
Kniahynychi, Ukraine

Villages in Ivano-Frankivsk Raion
Shtetls